Tanja Wenzel (born 27 July 1978) is a German film and television actress. She is best known for her performance as Isabell Mohr / Brandner in the soap opera Verbotene Liebe.

Selected filmography

References

External links
 

1978 births
Living people
Actresses from Berlin
German film actresses
German television actresses
20th-century German actresses
21st-century German actresses